Jason Robert Waddell (born June 11, 1981) is a former left-handed Major League Baseball pitcher. Waddell played baseball at La Sierra High School in Riverside, California before moving on to the minor leagues.

San Francisco Giants 
Waddell played for the Giants minor league organization from 2001 through 2008 before being moved to the Chicago Cubs.

Chicago Cubs 
Waddell made his Major League Baseball debut on May 31, 2009 Wearing #43, and appeared in three games before being released by the Chicago Cubs on August 5, 2009.

Detroit Tigers 
On August 18, 2009, Waddell signed a minor league contract with the Detroit Tigers and was assigned to the Double-A Erie SeaWolves.

On January 14, 2010, Waddell re-signed a minor league contract to return to the Detroit Tigers.

References

External links
, or Baseball Almanac

1981 births
Living people
Chicago Cubs players
Major League Baseball pitchers
Arizona League Giants players
Salem-Keizer Volcanoes players
Hagerstown Suns players
San Jose Giants players
Connecticut Defenders players
Iowa Cubs players
Erie SeaWolves players
Toledo Mud Hens players
Baseball players from California
Riverside City Tigers baseball players
Southern Maryland Blue Crabs players